The statue of Vicente Guerrero, a hero of independence and president of Mexico until he was driven from the presidency by conservatives, was installed in Mexico City's Plaza de San Fernando, in 1870. The installation follows the defeat of Mexican conservatives and reestablishment of the republic under liberal control. The bronze sculpture was created from the model in plaster by Mexican sculptor, Miguel Noreña (1839-1894). Noreña is best known for his sculpture topping the Monument to Cuauhtémoc, the last Aztec emperor.

References

External links

 

Bronze sculptures in Mexico
Historic center of Mexico City
Monuments and memorials in Mexico City
Outdoor sculptures in Mexico City
Sculptures of men in Mexico
Statues in Mexico City